Alvah Romaine Munger (August 3, 1842 – November 26, 1928) was an American farmer and politician.

Born in Marseilles, Illinois, Munger moved to Milwaukee, Wisconsin Territory in 1846 and then settled in the town of Scott, Sheboygan County, Wisconsin in 1848. During the American Civil War, Munger served in the 27th Wisconsin Volunteer Infantry Regiment. Munger was a farmer. He served as the Scott town supervisor, served in other town offices, including justice of the peace, and was a Republican. In 1891, Munger served in the Wisconsin State Assembly. He died at his home in Waldo, Wisconsin.

Notes

1842 births
1928 deaths
People from Marseilles, Illinois
People from Scott, Sheboygan County, Wisconsin
People of Wisconsin in the American Civil War
Farmers from Wisconsin
Wisconsin city council members
Republican Party members of the Wisconsin State Assembly
People from Waldo, Wisconsin